Matthew Williams (born April 18, 1951), is an American television producer, television writer, and professor.

Biography
Williams, whose birth name is Mark, is a graduate of the University of Evansville and did post-graduate work in theater at The University of New Orleans. Before becoming a writer and producer, he was an actor, appearing in commercials, theater and as Ben Martin on the CBN soap opera Another Life in the early 1980s.

One of his many credits is creating and executive producing, along with Carmen Finestra and David McFadzean, the TV series Home Improvement.  He produced films such as What Women Want.  He was a writer/producer  for The Cosby Show and A Different World, and wrote the screenplay for Wild Hearts Can't Be Broken.  Williams created the TV series Roseanne but was fired after its 13th episode; he retained "created by" credit for its series run and also for its spin-off The Conners.

Additionally, he has written the play "Between Daylight and Boonville", and directed and co-produced the feature film Where the Heart Is starring Natalie Portman. He also wrote and directed Walker Payne in 2006, starring Jason Patric, Drea de Matteo, and Sam Shepard.

Williams is originally from Evansville, Indiana. Williams is also an Adjunct Associate Professor of Film at Columbia University School of the Arts in New York, NY.

References

External links

20th-century American dramatists and playwrights
American male screenwriters
American television writers
Writers from Evansville, Indiana
University of Evansville alumni
Living people
Showrunners
American male television writers
American male dramatists and playwrights
20th-century American male writers
Home Improvement (TV series)
Film directors from Indiana
Television producers from Indiana
1951 births